Imene Agouar  (born 22 November 1993) is an Algerian judoka who competes internationally for Algeria. Her last victory was in the African Championships 2014 in women's half middleweight 63 kg.

Achievement 
Agouar won silver at the African Championships in 2015 after winning the title in 2014. In 2013, she won silver again. At the Grand Prix of Zagreb in 2014, she was close to winning the bronze medal. She has won one gold medal in the continental cup, three silver medals in the continental championships and two in the continental open and also two bronze medal in the continental championships.

References

Living people
1993 births
Algerian female judoka